The 1971–72 West Midlands (Regional) League season was the 72nd in the history of the West Midlands (Regional) League, an English association football competition for semi-professional and amateur teams based in the West Midlands county, Shropshire, Herefordshire, Worcestershire and southern Staffordshire.

Premier Division

The Premier Division featured 17 clubs which competed in the division last season, along with two new clubs:
GKN Sankeys, promoted from Division One
Warley, transferred from the Midland Football League

Also, Redditch changed name to Redditch United.

League table

References

External links

1971–72
W